Suzanne Kelly is a camogie player, winner of two All-Star awards in 2004 and 2006 and five All Ireland medals in 1999, 2000, 2001, 2003 and 2004. She was nominated for further All Star awards in 2005  and 2007.

School
She won an All-Ireland schools' medal in 1994 with St Mary's, Nenagh alongside fellow All Star winner Ciara Gaynor.

Career
She played in eight successive All Ireland finals for Tipperary winning five All Ireland medals in 1999, 2000, 2001, 2002, 2003 2004. 2005  and 2006. She won an All Ireland Intermediate medal with Tipperary in 1997.

References

Living people
Tipperary camogie players
Year of birth missing (living people)